Plana is a mountain in western Bulgaria, bounded by Sofia Valley to the north, Iskar River to the east, Samokov Valley to the south and southwest, and Vitosha Mountain to the northwest.  The summit Manastirishte rises to 1338m.

Plana hosts Peyuva Buka Chalet, the mountain refuges of Ray (‘Paradise’) and Savo, and the Kokalyane Monastery founded by Tsar Samuil of Bulgaria.  The homonymous village of Plana is the sole settlement situated in the interior of the mountain.

Plana Peak in Tangra Mountains on Livingston Island, Antarctica is named after Plana Mountain.

See also

Geography of Bulgaria
List of mountains in Bulgaria
List of mountains of the Balkans
List of ecoregions in Bulgaria
Pluton
Laccolith
Vitosha
Sredna Gora
Rila
Pirin
Balkan Mountains
Rhodope Mountains

References

 The Charming Mountain (in Bulgarian)
 Bulgarian Monastery: Kokalyane Monastery

Mountains of Bulgaria
Landforms of Sofia City Province
Rhodope mountain range